Victor Anomah Ngu (1926–2011) was a Cameroonian professor, researcher and one time Minister of Public Health.
The Professor became famous after inventing VANHIVAX (see Lachenal 2017), a vaccine he affirmed is an immunological solution in the treatment of HIV/AIDS.

He died at the Yaoundé University Teaching Hospital, CHU, after a protracted illness on 14 June 2011.

Education 

After passing his secondary school days at the prestigious St. Joseph's College, Sasse, Buea Cameroon]; he moved to the University of Ibadan (1948–1950),  St Mary’s Hospital Medical School and the University of London (1951–1954).

Career 

Professor of Surgery, University of Ibadan (1965–1971); Professor of Surgery, Université de Yaoundé (1971–1974); Vice Chancellor, Université de Yaoundé (1974–1982); President of the Association of African Universities (1981–1982); Minister of Public Health, Government of Cameroon (1984–1988); Director of the Cancer Research Laboratory, Université de Yaoundé (1984 - ); Founder - Hope Clinic Cameroon (1991)

Professional career 
1965–1971 Professor at the University of Ibadan
1971–1974 Professor at the University of Yaoundé
1974 - 1982 Vice Chancellor of the University of Yaoundé 
1981–1982 President of the Association of African Universities 
1984–1988 Minister of Public Health, Cameroon 
1984 Director of the Cancer Research Laboratory, University of Yaoundé 
1991 Founded Hope Clinic Cameroon

Awards 
The professor emeritus received a number of awards and distinctions

• Grand Commander of the National Order of Valour in Cameroon 

• Albert Lasker Medical Research Award in Clinical Cancer Chemotherapy 

• Dr. Samuel Lawrence Adesuyi Award and Medal by the West African Health Community

References

Lachenal, Guillaume

2017	The Cultural Politics of an African AIDS Vaccine The Vanhivax Controversy in Cameroon, 2001–2011. In Cultures Without Culturalism. K. Chemla and E.F. Keller, eds. Pp. 69-98. Durham: Duke University Press.

1926 births
2011 deaths
Alumni of the University of London
Academic staff of the University of Yaoundé
Cameroonian politicians
Recipients of the Order of Valour
Academic staff of the University of Ibadan